Woolworths Supermarkets (colloquially known in Australia as "Woolies" or "Woolly") is an Australian chain of supermarkets and grocery stores owned by Woolworths Group. Founded in 1924, Woolworths today is Australia's biggest supermarket chain with a market share of 33% as of 2019.

Woolworths specialises in groceries (vegetables, fruit, meat, packaged foods, etc.), but also sells magazines, DVDs, health and beauty products, household products, pet and baby supplies, and stationery. As of the end of June 2022, there were 995 Woolworths supermarkets and 90 Woolworths Metro convenience stores. Woolworths Online (formerly HomeShop) is a "click and collect" and home delivery service for Woolworths supermarkets.

In 2014, Woolworths' slogan became "The Fresh Food People".

History

Woolworths Limited (now Woolworths Group) was founded on 22 September 1924 by five Australian entrepreneursPercy Christmas, Stanley Chatterton, Cecil Scott Waine, George Creed and Ernest Williams. The first store was opened on 5 December 1924 in Pitt Street of Sydney's Imperial Arcade, called "Woolworths Stupendous Bargain Basement". Following the first store there were only 29 shareholders and there was little interest to accelerate the brand's growth. However, as trading continued and shareholders brought more capital, the dividends paid by the company increased from 5% to 50% after its third year of operation.

Consumer interest in the company grew after December 1924, as more branches of the store were established across Australia. Woolworths stores began selling a variety of goods, claiming the lowest prices as well as money back guarantees. At the forefront of innovation in Australia, Woolworths stores became the first variety store in the world to install receipt printing cash register machines in 1926.

The second Woolworths supermarket was opened on 6 August 1927, on Queen Street in Brisbane. The first Woolworths store in New Zealand was opened in 1929, but the chain has since been rebranded as Countdown . Following the opening of the Hobart store in 1940, Woolworths had a store in every state in Australia.

With the company and its stores running successfully, Woolworths began to experiment with expanding their grocery rangemore stores began stocking fresh fruits and vegetables and a larger range of food. The first self-service store in Beverly Hills, Sydney was opened in 1955. In 1958 the first supermarket was opened at Dee Why, followed by the first purpose built supermarket at Warrawong in 1960. As Woolworths gradually focused more on groceries, the first Big W department store was opened in 1964 at Jesmond, New South Wales.

In 2018, Woolworths Group stopped providing single-use plastic bags during checkout at the same time as Coles Supermarkets, bringing them in line with Australia's third-biggest supermarket, Aldi. In the following three months, Australian's plastic bag use dropped by 80%, leading to 1.5 billion fewer bags going to landfill. Woolworths also committed to removing 180 tonnes of plastic packaging from their products in 2018.

Acquisitions
In 1982, Woolworths Limited acquired two Tasmanian grocery brands: Roelf Vos and Purity, which were converted into Woolworths stores in 2000.

In 1958 Woolworths Limited acquired all 32 Brisbane Cash & Carry stores, which was a popular Brisbane grocery store chain. These were then later rebranded into Woolworths stores.

After the arrival of American supermarket giant Safeway Inc. in Australia in 1962, Australian Safeway Pty Ltd was bought by Woolworths in 1985 . Woolworths Limited acquired all of the Safeway stores and the naming rights in exchange for a 19.99% equity interest in Woolworths Limited. At the time of the acquisition, Safeway had 126 stores across Victoria, Queensland and New South Wales. All Safeway stores in Queensland and New South Wales were rebranded as Woolworths supermarkets, but most Victorian stores continued trading as Safeway. In 2008, Woolworths announced it would rebrand Safeway stores as Woolworths, and this process was completed in June 2017.

Slogan
In 1987, Woolworths launched the "Fresh Food People" campaign after implementing new company protocols for their fresh food departments. The slogan changed slightly in 2012 to "Australia's Fresh Food People" to promote the fact that 96% of fresh produce sold in Woolworths supermarkets is grown in Australia. In 2014 the original "The Fresh Food People" slogan returned with a new lineup of television commercials. Various other catchphrases have been used in recent advertisements, including "That's Today's Fresh Food People", and "Get Your Woolies Worth."

Loyalty schemes
Loyalty schemes include a number of incentives for purchasing at their stores by subsidising petrol prices at Caltex Woolworths petrol stations and the now defunct Woolworths Plus Petrol. Discounts included 2-cent, 4-cent, 6-cent and in some regional areas 10-cent discounts on fuel, rewarded for purchases over certain amounts.

Everyday Rewards and credit card

In September 2007, Woolworths began a trial in central-west New South Wales of Everyday Rewards, a Woolworths shopping card that automatically tracks supermarket purchases and fuel discounts, thus eliminating the need for shoppers to retain paper coupons. In addition it allows Woolworths to record purchases made by customers to offer them relevant promotions and for studies in demographics and marketing, hence incentives for customers who register their details. This followed Woolworths' announcement that it was planning to launch a general purpose credit card in 2008. Woolworths offered these credit card holders reward vouchers redeemable throughout its store network. Woolworths subsequently announced that the Woolworths Everyday Money MasterCard would be launched on 26 August 2008, allowing customers to earn shopping cards redeemable at Woolworths Group retailers.

In February 2008, following the New South Wales trial, Woolworths announced that its Everyday Rewards card would be rolled out nationally. The implementation began with South Australia and Northern Territory in mid-February 2008, and to other states (excluding Tasmania) by the end of May 2008. During the NSW trial, 50,000 cards were issued to customers.

Woolworths stated in June 2008 that "well over a million" shoppers had taken a card and registered their details. In August 2008, there were 3.8 million cards on issue, with 2.4 million cards registered.

From June 2009, Everyday Rewards cardholders were able to earn Qantas Frequent Flyer points by using their Everyday Rewards cards. Cardholders who had successfully linked their Frequent Flyer card to their registered Everyday Rewards card can earn one Frequent Flyer point for every dollar over $30 that they spent in store. In August 2009, Woolworths announced that there were 3.8 million cards registered, of which 1.2 million were linked to a Qantas Frequent Flyer account. On 26 October 2015, Woolworths announced that customer loyalty cards would no longer earn Qantas Frequent Flyer points from 1 January 2016, instead receiving more discounts on groceries. The new discount program came into effect on 28 October 2015. Everyday Rewards cardholders were sent new Woolworths Rewards cards. However 29 July 2020, the program was once again renamed Everyday Rewards.

On 31 August 2016, Woolworths made significant changes to the rewards program in response to customer feedback. Cardholders are able to earn 1 point per $1 spent on eligible products at Woolworths Supermarkets and Caltex Woolworths branded fuel outlets. When 2000 points have been accrued, a $10 discount can be applied to their next eligible transaction in Woolworths Supermarkets. Customers are also given the choice to "bank" their discounts until Christmas time, with the discounts able to be spent from 1 December until 1 January each year. Woolworths also reintroduced the ability to earn Qantas Frequent Flyer points when customers use their Rewards card. When 2,000 points have been accrued, instead of receiving a $10 discount, those points can be converted to 1000 Frequent Flyer points.<ref name="rewards-2020-relaunch

Frequent Shopper Club
The Frequent Shopper Club, stylised as F$C, was a reward program for shopping in Woolworths stores in Tasmania. It was started by Purity Supermarkets in 1992, and was in use until January 2021.

The program offered a $20 voucher for every 2000 points accrued. As of November 2017, Woolworths launched a basic website for the Frequent Shopper Club.

In July 2020, Woolworths announced that the program would be folded into the Everyday Rewards program.

Private label brands
Woolworths has a range of generic or private label brands:

Essentials

A budget label covering everyday household products and groceries. Products within this range typically feature a red and white Woolworths logo on the top left corner on the front side of the packaging.

Woolworths Food Range

Woolworths' most populous own brand range, it features food lines in all categories across the store. Products in this range feature a green and white logo. Customer can become part of a food sampling group called "Bunch" in order to test foods within this range and provide feedback to make improvements.

Gold

This own brand features premium products which are usually only available around Christmas time, and include products such as Christmas puddings, fruit mince pies and cakes.

Macro Wholefoods Market

Macro features a range of foods that are free from artificial sweeteners, colours, flavours, added MSG and hydrogenated oils. Many products in this range are promoted as organic foods. The brand was acquired by Woolworths in 2009, along with nine store leases in New South Wales and Victoria originally intended for use by its Thomas Dux Grocer business. As a result of the ceasing of operations of Thomas Dux in 2017 only two of the former Macro Wholefoods sites are still leased by Woolworths, from 2017 being used as Woolworths Metro supermarkets. However in 2021 one of the sites, in Black Rock, Victoria, was closed and is thought to be being replaced by a BWS or Dan Murphy's liquor outlet. Despite the closure of the sites, the brand is still sold in Woolworths supermarkets today.

Delicious Nutritious

This range is a collaboration between Woolworths and Australian personal trainer Michelle Bridges. The range is exclusively chilled and frozen meals, all of which include 2–3 serves of vegetables, grains and protein, and are all under 450 calories per serve.

The Odd Bunch

This is a fresh produce brand which features fruit and vegetables, such as carrots, lemons and apples, that are oddly shaped or are otherwise imperfect. These products are sold at a cheaper price as a compromise to this.

Supermarkets

Sub-brands

Countdown is the trading name in New Zealand. Woolworths also operated supermarket brands Foodtown and Woolworths until November 2011, which were rebranded as Countdown.
 Woolworths Metro is a chain of convenience stores launched in 2013. The first store opened in Sydney, and the chain now has over 80 stores across Australia. Three of them are former Thomas Dux Grocer stores, while others are mostly placed within central business districts.
 Ampol Woolworths MetroGo is a chain of smaller Woolworths Metro convenience stores launched in March 2022, and are found exclusively in some Ampol service stations. These stores are owned and operated by Ampol (and previously Caltex Australia), and were first launched in November 2019 as Woolworths Metro stores.

Defunct
 Flemings was a chain of supermarkets in Sydney and the Central Coast. On 19 May 2020, the final store in Jannali closed and was replaced with a Woolworths Metro store.
 Food For Less was a discount supermarket chain located in Queensland and New South Wales. Since 2010 stores were either closed or rebranded to Woolworths, with the last store rebranded in 2018.
 Safeway was the trading name of Woolworths for most of their Victorian stores until 2017 .
 Thomas Dux Grocer was launched in 2008 in two New South Wales locations. The stores had a larger fresh food offering than traditional Woolworths stores, along with a larger delicatessen section. At its peak the chain had 11 stores. From 2014, the stores gradually closed and the chain ceased operation in late 2017. Three of the stores were retained under the "Woolworths Metro" brand; the other seven were either closed entirely or sold to other businesses. In 2021 however, the former Thomas Dux site at Black Rock, Victoria, which was retained as a "Woolworths Metro" store, was closed and is thought to be being replaced by a BWS or Dan Murphy's liquor outlet.
 Caltex Woolworths, a joint venture with Ampol (previously Caltex Australia), operated service stations across Australia. Woolworths sold the operation to the EG Group in April 2019 which has since be renamed EG Australia. Woolworths and EG entered a 15-year agreement that would maintain its fuel discount redemption across the network, and enable Woolworths Rewards points to be earned on fuel transactions across its network.
 Caltex Safeway operated service stations in Victoria until it was converted to Caltex Woolworths in 2008–2010.
 Roelf Vos and Purity were trading names used in Tasmania prior to being rebranded as Woolworths in 2000.
 Woolworths Supermarket Liquor (including former Safeway Liquor in Victoria) was a liquor division of Woolworths with stores attached to its supermarkets, until all 475 stores were rebranded as BWS in 2012–2013.

Controversies

2020 spam marketing controversy
In July 2020, Woolworths were found guilty of breaching spam laws in excess of 5 million times and failing to unsubscribe customers from their mailing lists when requested to do so. The Australian Communications and Media Authority (ACMA) found Woolworths had unlawfully spammed more than a million customers between October 2018 and July 2019. The supermarket was found to have repeatedly ignored consumers who had tried to prevent receipt of marketing emails and had not attempted to improve, despite the AMCA notifying the company that they had received customer complaints. The company was fined $1,003,800.

ACMA chairman Nerida O'Loughlin said of the violation: "The spam rules have been in place for 17 years and Woolworths is a large and sophisticated organisation. The scale and prolonged nature of the non-compliance is inexcusable."

Wages
In 2019, Woolworths admitted to having not paid millions of dollars to its employees.

See also

List of supermarket chains in Oceania

References

External links

Supermarkets of Australia
Woolworths Group (Australia)
Food and drink companies established in 1924
Retail companies established in 1924
Australian companies established in 1924
Australian grocers